Khojatpur is a village in Ambedkar Nagar district, Uttar Pradesh, India. Its post office is in Karampur.

Villages in Ambedkar Nagar district